The fifth season of the Russian reality talent show The Voice Kids premiered on February 2, 2018 on Channel One. Dmitry Nagiev returned as the show's presenter. Valery Meladze returned for his second season. Pelageya, who returned for her fourth season after a one-season break, replaced Nyusha. Basta replaced Dima Bilan as a new coach for the show.
Rutger Garecht was announced the winner on April 20, 2018, marking Pelageya's first win as a coach and the first female coach to win in the show's history.

Coaches and presenters

There are two changes to the coaching panel from season four. Coach Valery Meladze is joined by Basta and Pelageya, who replaced Dima Bilan and Nyusha.

Also there is a change to the presenters panel from season four. Presenter Dmitry Nagiev is joined by Agata Muceniece, who replaced Svetlana Zeinalova.

Teams
Colour key

Blind auditions
Colour key

Episode 1 (Feb. 2)
The coaches performed "Abracadabra" at the start of the show.

Episode 2 (Feb. 9)

Episode 3 (Feb. 16)

Episode 4 (Feb. 22)

Episode 5 (March 7)

Episode 6 (March 16)

The Battles
The Battles round started with the first half of episode 7 and ended with the first half of episode 9 (broadcast on March 23, 30, 2018; on April 6, 2018).
Contestants who win their battle will advance to the Sing-off rounds.
Colour key

The Sing-offs
The Sing-offs round started with the second half of episode 7 and ended with the second half of episode 9 (broadcast on March 23, 30, 2018; on April 6, 2018). 
Contestants who was saved by their coaches will advance to the Final.
Colour key

Live shows
Colour key

Week 1: Live Playoffs (April 13)
As with Season 2, each coach saved three artists who were eliminated in the Sing-offs.
Playoff results were voted on in real time. Nine artists sang live and six of them were eliminated by the end of the night.
Three saved artists advanced to the Final.

Week 2: Final (April 20)

Reception

Rating

References

5
2018 Russian television seasons